The General Presidency for Girls Education (GPGE), also known as the Directorate General for Girls Education (DGGE), was an autonomous government entity in Saudi Arabia that regulated nearly all forms of women's education in the country from 1959 to 2002, independent from supervision of the Ministry of Knowledge.

History
Established in 1959 through a royal decree issued by King Saud, it supervised both state-run and private schools for girls, except foreign ones and exercised powers parallel to the Ministry of Knowledge, which then only had authority over schools with male students. It was dissolved and subsequently merged with the Ministry of Knowledge in the aftermath of the Mecca girls' school fire incident in 2002.

References 

Former government agencies of Saudi Arabia
Education in Saudi Arabia
Women and education